This is a complete filmography of Chinese actress, director and producer Zhao Wei. In an acting career that spanned more than twenty years, Zhao performed on screen, television and stage. She is regarded by many as Mainland China's first "national idol" since the economic reform began in 1978. Zhao appeared in a range of genres, including comedies, period dramas, modern dramas, actions. Zhao was awarded the Hong Kong Film Award, Hong Kong Film Critics Society Award, Golden Rooster Award, Hundred Flowers Award, Shanghai Film Critics Award, Huabiao Award, Golden Eagle TV Award, and as well as the Shanghai Film Festival Golden Globet.

As one of the most successful Chinese actresses in terms of box office receipts, her films have grossed a total of more than over ￥5 billion yuan in China. Hong Kong Trade Development Council selected her as one of "top box office star" during 2008-2009. Zhao's directorial debut So Young (2013) has grossed over US$118 million with a US$5 million budget. According to New Classic Media's IPO application, Zhao Wei's salary of Tiger Mom (2015) was 42.7925 million yuan, equally 1 million yuan per episode. And the ROI of the show was 300%.

Not only appointed as judges China Film Directors Guild Award, Golden Phoenix Award, Zhao also was named as jury member by several international film festivals main competition, such as Venice, Shanghai and Tokyo.

As actress

Film

Television

Stage

Dubbing

Sound Recording

As director or producer

Theatrical releases

Television

Music video

Short films

Other works

Hosting

As Judge

Radio Opera

See also 
 Awards and nominations received by Zhao Wei

References

External links 
 
 

 
Zhao, Wei
Zhao, Wei